Sargocentron iota, the dwarf squirrelfish, is a nocturnal benthopalegic species of squirrelfish belonging to the genus of Sargocentron. It can be found in the Indo-Pacific region. It inhabits steep outer reef slopes.

References

iota
Fish of the Pacific Ocean
Taxa named by John Ernest Randall
 Fish of the Indian Ocean